Mark Lu Cruz (born July 27, 1992) is a Filipino professional basketball player for the GenSan Warriors of the Maharlika Pilipinas Basketball League (MPBL). He earned the moniker Ant Man during his days in the NCAA.

College career

Cruz studied at the Colegio de San Juan de Letran and played for the Letran Knights varsity squad. Teaming up with Kevin Alas and Raymond Almazan, and later Kevin Racal and Rey Nambatac, he propelled the Knights to the finals in 2012 and 2013, only to lose to the San Beda Red Lions on both occasions. After missing the Final Four the year before, he flourished under new coach Aldin Ayo, leading the Knights in his final collegiate year. In 2015, he led the Knights to an NCAA Championship against their nemesis San Beda, ending a 10-year title drought. He was awarded the Finals MVP.

Professional career

Cruz was drafted 30th overall in the 2015 Rookie Draft by the Star Hotshots. Unlike his fellow rookies, he signed a one-conference contract with the Hotshots. In his PBA debut he tallied 7 points, 2 rebounds and 1 steal in a loss to the San Miguel Beermen In May 2016, Cruz was traded by Star to Phoenix Fuel Masters in a three-team trade that also involved GlobalPort Batang Pier.

Personal life

Cruz is the younger brother of former UP Fighting Maroons star and PBA player Marvin Cruz. His favorite player growing up was Jimmy Alapag. He took up a degree in Operations Management and hopes to start a business someday.

References

1992 births
Living people
Blackwater Bossing players
Filipino men's basketball players
Letran Knights basketball players
Phoenix Super LPG Fuel Masters players
Point guards
Basketball players from Quezon City
Magnolia Hotshots players
Maharlika Pilipinas Basketball League players
Magnolia Hotshots draft picks